Last Man Standing is the 39th studio album released by American recording artist, pianist, and rock and roll pioneer Jerry Lee Lewis in September 2006. The album consists of duets between Lewis and some of the biggest names in both rock and country music, past and present. The title derives from the generation of 1950s Sun Studios recording artists such as Johnny Cash, Roy Orbison, Charlie Rich, Carl Perkins, and Elvis Presley; all of whom had died, leaving Lewis the "last man standing". Lewis died in October 2022. Following the success of the album, a DVD Last Man Standing Live was released featuring similar duets with famous artists.

Critical reception

Last Man Standing received very positive reviews from critics. Stephen Thomas Erlewine of AllMusic called the recording, "a record that celebrates life, both in its joys and sorrows, and it's hard not to see it as nothing short of inspiring" and the editorial team of the site gave it four out of five stars. The same score was awarded by Gavin Edwards in Rolling Stone, praising the performance by writing, "his throat is in better shape than you might expect, most of his command now comes from the slamming, swinging passion of his barrelhouse piano". For PopMatters, Vladimir Wormwood gave the album seven out of 10, summing up his review by focusing on the Merle Haggard duet "Just Bummin' Around": "It is a portrait of the aging musician with the showmanship removed. Long live Jerry Lee Lewis".

Track listing
"Rock and Roll" (John Paul Jones, John Bonham, Jimmy Page, Robert Plant) – 2:14
With Jimmy Page
"Before the Night Is Over" (Ben Peters) – 3:39
With B. B. King
"Pink Cadillac" (Bruce Springsteen) – 3:55
With Bruce Springsteen
"Evening Gown" (Mick Jagger) – 3:57
With Mick Jagger and Ron Wood
"You Don't Have to Go" (Jimmy Reed) – 4:00
With Neil Young
"Twilight" (Robbie Robertson) – 2:48
With Robbie Robertson
"Travelin' Band" (John Fogerty) – 2:01
With John Fogerty
"That Kind of Fool" (Mack Vickery) – 4:14
With Keith Richards
"Sweet Little Sixteen" (Chuck Berry) – 3:04
With Ringo Starr
"Just a Bummin' Around" (Pete Graves) – 2:43
With Merle Haggard
"Honky Tonk Woman" (Jagger/Richards) – 2:21
With Kid Rock
"What's Made Milwaukee Famous (Has Made a Loser Out of Me)" (Glenn Sutton) – 2:39
With Rod Stewart
"Don't Be Ashamed of Your Age" (Cindy Walker, Bob Wills) – 1:59
With George Jones
"Couple More Years" (Dennis Locorriere, Shel Silverstein) – 5:13
With Willie Nelson
"Old Glory" (Paul Roberts, Shelby Darnell, Jerry Lee Lewis) – 2:05
With Toby Keith
"Trouble in Mind" (Richard M. Jones) – 3:49
With Eric Clapton
"I Saw Her Standing There" (John Lennon, Paul McCartney) – 2:21
With Little Richard
"Lost Highway" (Leon Payne) – 2:59
With Delaney Bramlett
"Hadacol Boogie" (Bill Nettles) – 3:18
With Buddy Guy
"What Makes the Irish Heart Beat" (Van Morrison) – 4:12
With Don Henley
"The Pilgrim Ch. 33" (Kris Kristofferson) – 3:00
With Kris Kristofferson

Bonus tracks
The album was released with several promotional download-only tracks depending on the venue at which the album was purchased. For physical retail outlets, the bonus track was available from their official web site.
"Before the Night Is Over" (Rhapsody)
"Bright Lights, Big City" (Wal-Mart)
"Don't Put No Headstones on My Grave" (iTunes)
"I Don't Want to Be Lonely Tonight" (URGE)
"Last Cheaters' Waltz" (Target)
"Mexicali Rose" (Country Music Television)
"Trouble in Mind" (Napster)
"Why You Been Gone So Long?" (Best Buy)
"You Belong to Me" (Best Buy)
"A Couple More Years" — Live

Personnel
In addition to the guest stars, the album features Kenny Lovelace and producer Jimmy Rip on guitar, James "Hutch" Hutchinson on bass, and Jim Keltner playing drums. The liner notes were written by Peter Guralnick.  Kris Kristofferson's track produced by J. Carter Tutwiler at NoCanBeat Studios and mixed by Jimmy Rip.

Unreleased songs
Lewis recorded several more songs for the album than were released, including:
"Cry" (Johnnie Ray)
"Last Night I Heard You Call My Name"
"Miss the Mississippi and You"
A re-recording of the song that first appeared on Lewis' 1995 album Young Blood, featuring no backing.
"Roll Over Beethoven" (Chuck Berry)
With the band, supplemented by Ringo Starr, Ivan Neville, James Hutchinson and Nils Lofgren .
"You Can't Catch Me" (Chuck Berry)

Chart performance

References

External links

Electronic Press Kit
An interview with the Washington Post

2006 albums
Albums recorded at Sun Studio
Jerry Lee Lewis albums
Vocal duet albums
Covers albums
Albums produced by Jimmy Rip
Albums produced by Steve Bing